C. flavus  may refer to:
 Callionymus flavus, a ray-finned fish species
 Conus flavus, a sea snail species
 Crocus flavus, the Dutch yellow crocus, a plant species found in Europe

See also
 Flavus (disambiguation)